Several ships have been named Camden:

  was a merchant ship built upon the River Thames. She made two voyages transporting convicts from England to Australia. She was wrecked in 1836.
  was built at Whitby and served as a general trader for much of her career, though in 1820-21 she made one voyage to Bombay for the British East India Company (EIC). Between 1833 and 1837 she was a Greenland whaler out of the Whitby whale fishery. She was last listed in 1850.
 , of 194 tons (bm), was a Post Office Packet Service Falmouth packet, launched at Falmouth. By 1838 she was sailing in the South Seas for the London Missionary Society.
 Camden was a sealer lost on the coast of Patagonia in March 1826.

See also
  - two ships

Ship names